Bruce Miller is a politician in Alberta, Canada and former member of the Legislative Assembly of Alberta for the constituency of Edmonton-Glenora. He was first elected on November 22, 2004 as a Liberal, but was defeated in his 2008 re-election bid by Progressive Conservative Heather Klimchuk.

He has had a notable career as a churchman, educator and community activist/advocate. He received the Queen's Jubilee award for community service in 2002. He co-founded the Alberta Quality of Life Commission in 1993, and served for many years as the Vice-President of the Mahatma Gandhi Canadian Foundation for World Peace.

As MLA, Miller served as the Deputy Whip of the Liberal Caucus, and authored a paper on reforming Alberta's welfare system. He was also a member of the Alberta Government's affordable housing task force, which travelled throughout Alberta in 2007 researching the issue of housing.

Miller has also been an advocate for the communities of Edmonton-Glenora. He has presented before Edmonton City Council and the Edmonton Public School Board, representing communities facing major redevelopment projects and the possibility of school closures.

Miller has also served on the Conflicts of Interest Act Review Committee and the Alberta Legislature's Policy Field Committee on Managing Growth Pressures.

Dr. Miller graduated from Carleton University with the B.A. degree in 1963. His graduate degrees include:  M.Div. (1966) from Westminster Theological Seminary in Philadelphia; S.T.M (1967) from Union Theological Seminary in New York, and the Ph.D (1984) from the Divinity School of the University of Chicago. Dr. Miller also did doctoral studies at the Free University of Amsterdam in 1969–70.

From 1990 to the present he has been a Fellow of the Jesus Seminar, an international group of scholars focusing on the authentic words and deeds of Jesus.

From 2004 to the present he has been an Academic Advisor for Liberal Studies in the Faculty of Extension of the University of Alberta, and has taught courses such as "Will the real Jesus please stand up?" and "Symbols and Myths in Eastern Religions."

Election results

2008 general election

2004 general election

References

External links
St. Stephen's College, Edmonton, Adjunct Faculty Biographies
Jesus Seminar, Westar Institute L. Bruce Miller Biography
Edmonton Real Estate Weekly, Interview with L. Bruce Miller

Alberta Liberal Party MLAs
Carleton University alumni
Politicians from Edmonton
Living people
Ministers of the United Church of Canada
Academic staff of the University of Alberta
Westminster Theological Seminary alumni
21st-century Canadian politicians
Place of birth missing (living people)
Year of birth missing (living people)